The 2022 Empire Women's Indoor 1 was a professional tennis tournament played on indoor hard courts. It was the ninth edition of the tournament which was part of the 2022 ITF Women's World Tennis Tour. It took place in Trnava, Slovakia between 3 and 9 October 2022.

Champions

Singles

  Katie Swan def.  Wang Xinyu, 6–1, 3–6, 6–4

Doubles

  Mariam Bolkvadze /  Maia Lumsden def.  Diāna Marcinkēviča /  Conny Perrin, 6–2, 6–3

Singles main draw entrants

Seeds

 1 Rankings are as of 26 September 2022.

Other entrants
The following players received wildcards into the singles main draw:
  Alisa Oktiabreva
  Ela Pláteníková
  Rebecca Šramková
  Radka Zelníčková

The following player received entry into the singles main draw using a protected ranking:
  Maia Lumsden

The following player received entry into the singles main draw using a junior exempt:
  Petra Marčinko

The following players received entry from the qualifying draw:
  Mona Barthel
  Freya Christie
  Renáta Jamrichová
  Kathleen Kanev
  Vera Lapko
  Sofia Milatová
  Lola Radivojević
  Arlinda Rushiti

References

External links
 2022 Empire Women's Indoor 1 at ITFtennis.com
 Official website

2022 ITF Women's World Tennis Tour
2022 in Slovak sport
October 2022 sports events in Slovakia